Carlyle Deon Mitchell (born 8 August 1987) is a Trinidadian international footballer who plays as a centre back for Kaya–Iloilo and the Trinidad and Tobago national football team.

Club career
Born in Arima, Mitchell began his career in the TT Pro League with Joe Public in 2008.

He signed with Vancouver Whitecaps FC of Major League Soccer on 15 September 2011, making his debut for the club on 6 October 2011. Mitchell was loaned to NASL club FC Edmonton on 11 March 2013. He was released by the Whitecaps on 14 November 2014 after their 2014 season ended.

He signed for South Korean club Seoul E-Land in December 2014, for the 2015 season.

In July 2017, he signed for Indian I-League club East Bengal after a brief spell with San Juan Jabloteh, and appeared in the Calcutta Football League.

In early February 2018, Mitchell joined Central FC. However, he left shortly after and signed with Indy Eleven on 12 February 2018, alongside Central teammate Nathan Lewis.

Mitchell moved to the Philippines in early 2020, to join Kaya–Iloilo of the Philippines Football League.

International career
Mitchell made his international debut for Trinidad and Tobago in 2010. He scored his first goal for the national side in a 2018 FIFA World Cup Qualification 3–1 loss to Honduras on 15 November 2016.

International goals
Scores and results list Trinidad and Tobago's goal tally first.

References

External links

1987 births
Living people
People from Arima
Trinidad and Tobago footballers
Trinidad and Tobago expatriate footballers
Trinidad and Tobago international footballers
Association football defenders
Joe Public F.C. players
Vancouver Whitecaps FC players
FC Edmonton players
Seoul E-Land FC players
East Bengal Club players
Indy Eleven players
St. Ann's Rangers F.C. players
Expatriate soccer players in Canada
Expatriate footballers in South Korea
TT Pro League players
Major League Soccer players
North American Soccer League players
2013 CONCACAF Gold Cup players
2014 Caribbean Cup players
K League 2 players
USL Championship players
Trinidad and Tobago expatriate sportspeople in South Korea
Expatriate footballers in India
Expatriate soccer players in the United States
Trinidad and Tobago expatriate sportspeople in the United States
2019 CONCACAF Gold Cup players
Expatriate footballers in the Philippines